Ectopioglossa is a far eastern genus of potter wasps. It contains the following species:

 Ectopioglossa advocata (Giordani Soika, 1944)
 Ectopioglossa borsatoi Giordani Soika, 1996
 Ectopioglossa henseni Gusenleitner, 1990
 Ectopioglossa keiseri Vecht, 1963
 Ectopioglossa laminata Vecht, 1963
 Ectopioglossa lucida Vecht, 1963
 Ectopioglossa mutata Gusenleitner, 1991
 Ectopioglossa nigerrima Giordani Soika, 1990
 Ectopioglossa ovalis Giordani Soika, 1993
 Ectopioglossa palustris Vecht, 1963
 Ectopioglossa polita (Smith, 1861)
 Ectopioglossa samriensis (Giordani Soika, 1941)
 Ectopioglossa sublaevis Vecht, 1963
 Ectopioglossa sumbana Vecht, 1963
 Ectopioglossa taiwana (Sonan, 1938)

References

Biological pest control wasps
Potter wasps